The Heroes is a 1994 Italian heist comedy film directed by Carlo Vanzina.

Cast
Claudio Amendola as Fabio
Monica Bellucci as Deborah
Ricky Memphis as Enzo
Tony Sperandeo as Tonino
Pier Maria Cecchini as Giulio
Ugo Conti as Igor
Mirella Falco as Signora Motta
Paolo Lombardi as the Commissioner
Umberto Smaila as the jewellery owner
Toni Ucci as Sor Peppe
Pietro Ghislandi as Colnaghi
Riccardo Calvani as Squillace
Ugo Bologna as Calabrò

References

External links

1994 films
Films directed by Carlo Vanzina
1990s Italian-language films
1994 comedy films
Italian comedy films
1990s Italian films